Coleophora depunctella is a moth of the family Coleophoridae. It is found in North Macedonia and Greece.

References

depunctella
Moths described in 1961
Moths of Europe